In the theory of formal languages of computer science, mathematics, and linguistics, a Dyck word is a balanced string of brackets.
The set of Dyck words forms a Dyck language. The simplest, D1, use just two matching brackets, e.g. ( and ).

Dyck words and language are named after the mathematician Walther von Dyck. They have applications in the parsing of expressions that must have a correctly nested sequence of brackets, such as arithmetic or algebraic expressions.

Formal definition
Let  be the alphabet consisting of the symbols [ and ]. Let  denote its Kleene closure.
The Dyck language is defined as:

Context-free grammar 
It may be helpful to define the Dyck language via a context-free grammar in some situations.
The Dyck language is generated by the context-free grammar with a single non-terminal , and the production:

 

That is, S is either the empty string or is "[", an element of the Dyck language, the matching "]", and an element of the Dyck language.

An alternative context-free grammar for the Dyck language is given by the production:

 

That is, S is zero or more occurrences of the combination of "[", an element of the Dyck language, and a matching "]", where multiple elements of the Dyck language on the right side of the production are free to differ from each other.

Alternative definition 
In yet other contexts it may instead be helpful to define the Dyck language by splitting  into equivalence classes, as follows.

Transitivity is clear from the definition.

The equivalence relation partitions the language  into equivalence classes. If we take  to denote the empty string, then the language corresponding to the equivalence class  is called the Dyck language.

Properties

 The Dyck language is closed under the operation of concatenation.
 By treating  as an algebraic monoid under concatenation we see that the monoid structure transfers onto the quotient , resulting in the syntactic monoid of the Dyck language.  The class  will be denoted .
 The syntactic monoid of the Dyck language is not commutative:  if  and  then .
 By the Chomsky–Schützenberger representation theorem, any context-free language is a homomorphic image of the intersection of some regular language with a Dyck language on one or more kinds of bracket pairs.
 The Dyck language with two distinct types of brackets can be recognized in the complexity class .
 The number of distinct Dyck words with exactly  pairs of parentheses and  innermost pairs (viz. the substring ) is the Narayana number .
 The number of distinct Dyck words with exactly  pairs of parentheses is the -th Catalan number . Notice that the Dyck language of words with  parentheses pairs is equal to the union, over all possible , of the Dyck languages of words of  parentheses pairs with  innermost pairs, as defined in the previous point.

Examples
We can define an equivalence relation  on the Dyck language . For  we have  if and only if , i.e.  and  have the same length. This relation partitions the Dyck language: . We have  where . Note that  is empty for odd .

Having introduced the Dyck words of length , we can introduce a relationship on them. A proper swap in a word  swaps an occurrence of '][' with '[]'.
For each  the relation  makes  into a partially ordered set. To see that  is also antisymmetric we introduce an auxiliary function  defined as a sum over all prefixes  of :

 

The following table illustrates that  is strictly monotonic with respect to proper swaps.

Hence  so  when there is a proper swap that takes  into . But then  which is nonsensical.

The partial ordered set  is shown in the illustration accompanying the introduction if we interpret a [ as going up and ] as going down.

Generalizations 

There exist variants of the Dyck language with multiple delimiters, e.g., D2 on the alphabet "(", ")", "[", and "]". The words of such a language are the ones which are well-parenthesized for all delimiters, i.e., one can read the word from left to right, push every opening delimiter on the stack, and whenever we reach a closing delimiter then we must be able to pop the matching opening delimiter from the top of the stack. (The counting algorithm above does not generalise).

See also
 Dyck congruence
 Lattice word

Notes

References
 
 A proof of the Chomsky Schützenberger theorem
 An AMS blog entry on Dyck words
Formal languages